The MTV Video Music Award for Best K-Pop Video award was first introduced to the MTV Music Video Awards in 2019.

Recipients

Artists with multiple nominations
4 nominations
 BTS

3 nominations 
 Monsta X

2 nominations
 Blackpink
 Exo
 TXT
 (G)I-dle
 Twice
 Seventeen

References 

MTV Video Music Awards
Awards established in 2019